The 1954 Yugoslav First Basketball League season is the 10th season of the Yugoslav First Basketball League, the highest professional basketball league in SFR Yugoslavia.

Regular season

League table

Winning Roster  
The winning roster of Crvena zvezda:
  Dragan Godžić
  Đorđe Andrijašević
  Obren Popović
  Borislav Ćurčić
  Ladislav Demšar
  Milan Bjegojević
  Vojislav Pavasović
  Borko Jovanović
  Miroljub Čavić
  Radivoje Ostojić
  Đorđe Konjović
  Đorđe Otašević
  Srđan Kalember
  Milorad Ðerić
  Milan Radivojević
  Branko Nešić

Coach:  Nebojša Popović

External links  
 Yugoslav First Basketball League Archive 

Yugoslav First Basketball League seasons